Rudolph T. Reid (born 13 November 1952) is a Trinidad and Tobago sprinter. He competed in the men's 100 metres at the 1972 Summer Olympics.

References

External links
 

1952 births
Living people
Athletes (track and field) at the 1971 Pan American Games
Athletes (track and field) at the 1972 Summer Olympics
Athletes (track and field) at the 1975 Pan American Games
Trinidad and Tobago male sprinters
Olympic athletes of Trinidad and Tobago
Pan American Games competitors for Trinidad and Tobago
Place of birth missing (living people)